Monitor lizards are lizards in the genus Varanus, the only extant genus in the family Varanidae. They are native to Africa, Asia, and Oceania, and one species is also found in the Americas as an invasive species.  About 80 species are recognized.

Monitor lizards have long necks, powerful tails and claws, and well-developed limbs. Most monitor species are terrestrial, but arboreal and semiaquatic monitors are also known. While most monitor lizards are carnivorous, eating eggs, smaller reptiles, fish, birds, insects, and small mammals, some also eat fruit and vegetation, depending on where they live.

Distribution
The various species cover a vast area, occurring through Africa, the Indian subcontinent, to China, the Ryukyu Islands in southern Japan, south to Southeast Asia to Thailand, Malaysia, Brunei, Indonesia, the Philippines, New Guinea, Australia, and islands of the Indian Ocean and the South China Sea. The West African Nile monitor (Varanus stellatus) is now found in South Florida. Monitor lizards also occurred widely in Europe in the Neogene, with the last known remains in the region dating to the Middle Pleistocene.

Habits and diet
Most monitor lizards are almost entirely carnivorous, consuming prey as varied as insects, crustaceans, arachnids, myriapods, mollusks, fish, amphibians, reptiles, birds, and mammals. Most species feed on invertebrates as juveniles and shift to feeding on vertebrates as adults. Deer make up about 50% of the diet of adults of the largest species, Varanus komodoensis. In contrast, three arboreal species from the Philippines, Varanus bitatawa, Varanus mabitang, and Varanus olivaceus, are primarily fruit eaters. Although normally solitary, groups as large as 25 individual monitor lizards are common in ecosystems that have limited water resources.

Biology
The genus Varanus is considered unique among animals in that its members are relatively morphologically conservative, yet show a very large size range. Finer morphological features such as the shape of the skull and limbs do vary, though, and are strongly related to the ecology of each species.

Monitor lizards maintain large territories and employ active-pursuit hunting techniques that are reminiscent of similar-sized mammals. The active nature of monitor lizards has led to numerous studies on the metabolic capacities of these lizards. The general consensus is that monitor lizards have the highest standard metabolic rates of all extant reptiles.

Like snakes, monitor lizards have highly forked tongues that act as part of the "smell" sense, where the tips of the tongue carry molecules from the environment to sensory organs in the skull. The forked apparatus allows for these lizards to sense boundaries in the molecules they collect, almost smelling in "stereo". 

Monitor lizards have a high aerobic scope that is afforded, in part, by their heart anatomy. Whereas most reptiles are considered to have three-chambered hearts, the hearts of monitor lizards – as with those of boas and pythons – have a well developed ventricular septum that completely separates the pulmonary and systemic sides of the circulatory system during systole. This allows monitor lizards to create mammalian-equivalent pressure differentials between the pulmonary and systemic circuits, which in turn ensure that oxygenated blood is quickly distributed to the body without also flooding the lungs with high-pressure blood.

Anatomical and molecular studies indicate that all varanids (and possibly all lizards) are partially venomous. The venom of monitor lizards is diverse and complex, as a result of the diverse ecological niches monitor lizards occupy.
Monitor lizards are oviparous, laying from seven to 38 eggs, which they often cover with soil or protect in a hollow tree stump. Some monitor lizards, including the Komodo dragon, are capable of parthenogenesis.

Evolution

Varanus is the only living member of the family Varanidae. Varanidae last shared a common ancestor with their closest living relatives, earless "monitors", during the Late Cretaceous. The oldest known members of Varanidae are known from the Late Cretaceous of Mongolia. During the Eocene, the varanid Saniwa occurred in North America. The closest known relative of Varanus is Archaeovaranus from the Eocene of China, suggesting that the genus Varanus is of Asian origin. The oldest fossils of Varanus date to the early Miocene.

Many of the species within the various subgenera also form species complexes with each other:

V. indicus species complex (V. indicus, V. cerambonensis, V. caerulivirens, V. colei, V. obor, V. lirugensis, V. rainerguentheri, V. zugorum)

V. doreanus species complex (V. doreanus, V. finschi, V. semotus, V. yuwonoi)

V. gouldii species complex (V. gouldii, V. rosenbergi, V. panoptes)

V. bengalensis species complex (V. bengalensis, V. nebulosus)

V. acanthurus species complex (V. acanthurus, V. baritji, V. primordius, V. storri)

V. exanthematicus species complex (V. exanthematicus, V. albigularis, V. yemenensis)

V. timorensis species complex (V. timorensis, V. auffenbergi, V. scalaris, V. similis, V. tristis)

V. niloticus species complex (V. niloticus, V. stellatus)

V. salvator species complex (V. salvator, V. cumingi, V. nuchalis, V. togianus, V. marmoratus)

The tree monitors of the V. prasinus species complex (V. prasinus, V. beccarii, V. boehmei, V. bogerti, V. keithhornei, V. kordensis, V. macraei, V. reisingeri, V. telenesetes) were once in the subgenus Euprepriosaurus, but as of 2016, form their own subgenus Hapturosaurus.

V. jobiensis was once considered to be a member of the V. indicus species complex, but is now considered to represent its own species complex.

Etymology
The generic name Varanus is derived from the Arabic word  waral [Standard Arabic] /  warar [Colloquially] /  waran [Colloquially], from a common Semitic root ouran, waran, warar or  waral, meaning "lizard beast".

In English, they are known as "monitors" or "monitor lizards". The earlier term "monitory lizard" became rare by about 1920. The name may have been suggested by the occasional habit of varanids to stand on their two hind legs and to appear to "monitor", or perhaps from their supposed habit of "warning people of the approach of venomous animals". But all of these explanations for the name "monitor" postdate Linnaeus giving the scientific name Lacerta monitor to the Nile monitor in 1758, which may have been based on a mistaken idea by Linnaeus that the German word Waran (borrowed from Arabic) was connected to warnen (to warn), leading him to incorrectly Latinize it as monitor ('warner', 'adviser').

Austronesian languages spoken across Southeast Asia, where varanids are common, have a large number of slightly related local names for them. They are usually known as biawak (Malay, including Indonesian standard variety), bayawak (Filipino), binjawak or minjawak or nyambik (Javanese), or variations thereof. Other names include hokai (Solomon Islands); bwo, puo, or soa (Maluku); halo (Cebu); galuf or kaluf (Micronesia and the Caroline Islands); batua or butaan (Luzon); alu (Bali); hora or ghora (Komodo group of islands); phut (Burmese); and guibang (Manobo).

Due to confusion with the large New World lizards of the family Iguanidae, the lizards became known as "goannas" in Australia. Similarly, in South African English, they are referred to as leguaans, or likkewaans, from the Dutch term for the Iguanidae, leguanen.

Intelligence

Some species of monitors can count; studies feeding rock monitors varying numbers of snails showed that they can distinguish numbers up to six. Nile monitors have been observed to cooperate when foraging; one animal lures the female crocodile away from her nest, while the other opens the nest to feed on the eggs. The decoy then returns to also feed on the eggs. Komodo dragons at the National Zoo in Washington, DC, recognize their keepers and seem to have distinct personalities. Two species of tree monitor in British zoos have been observed shredding leaves, apparently as a form of play.

Exploitation

As pets

Monitor lizards have become a staple in the reptile pet trade. The most commonly kept monitors are the savannah monitor and Ackies dwarf monitor, due to their relatively small size, low cost, and relatively calm dispositions with regular handling. Among others, black-throated monitors, Timor monitors, Asian water monitors, Nile monitors, mangrove monitors, emerald tree monitors, black tree monitors, roughneck monitors, Dumeril's monitors, peach-throated monitors, crocodile monitors, and Argus monitors have been kept in captivity.

Traditional medicines 
Monitor lizards are poached in some South- and Southeast Asian countries as their organs and fat is used in some traditional medicines, although there is no scientific evidence as to their effectiveness.

Monitor lizard meat, particularly the tongue and liver, is eaten in parts of India and Malaysia, and is supposed to be an aphrodisiac.

In parts of Pakistan and southern India, as well in Northeastern India particularly Assam the different parts of monitor lizards are traditionally used for treating rheumatic pain, skin infections, hemorrhoids, and the oil is used as an aphrodisiac lubricant (sande ka tel).

Consuming raw blood and flesh of monitor lizards has been reported to cause eosinophilic meningoencephalitis, as some monitors are hosts for the parasite Angiostrongylus cantonensis.

Leather 
"Large-scale exploitation" of monitor lizards is undertaken for their skins, which are described as being "of considerable utility" in the leather industry. In Papua New Guinea, monitor lizard leather is used for membranes in traditional drums (called kundu), and these lizards are referred to as kundu palai or "drum lizard" in Tok Pisin, the main Papuan trade language. Monitor lizard skins are prized in making the resonant part of serjas (Bodo folk sarangis) and dotaras (native strummed string instruments of Assam, Bengal and other eastern states). The leather is also used in making a Carnatic music percussion instrument called the kanjira.

Food 
The meat of monitor lizards is eaten by some tribes in India, Nepal, the Philippines, Australia, South Africa and  West Africa as a supplemental meat source. Both meat and eggs are also  eaten in Southeast Asian countries such as Vietnam and Thailand as a delicacy.

Conservation
According to IUCN Red List of threatened species, most of the monitor lizards species fall in the categories of least concern, but the population is decreasing globally. All but five species of monitor lizards are classified by the Convention on International Trade in Endangered Species of Wild Fauna and Flora under Appendix II, which is loosely defined as species that are not necessarily threatened with extinction but may become so unless trade in such species is subject to strict regulation to avoid use incompatible with the survival of the species in the wild. The remaining five species – V. bengalensis, V. flavescens, V. griseus, V. komodoensis, and V. nebulosus – are classified under CITES Appendix I, which outlaws international commercial trade in the species.

The yellow monitor (V. flavescens) is protected in all countries in its range except Bhutan, Nepal, India, Pakistan, and Bangladesh.

In Tamil Nadu and all other parts of South India, catching or killing of monitor lizards is banned under the Protected Species Act.

Taxonomy

Genus Varanus

 V. bolkayi
 V. darevskii
 V. emeritus (=V. salvadorii?)
 V. hooijeri
 V. hofmanni
 V. lungui
 V. marathonensis
 V. mokrensis
 V. pronini
 V. rusingensis
 V. semjonovi
 V. tyrasiensis (=V. hofmanni?)

Subgenus Empagusia:

V. bengalensis, Bengal monitor
V. dumerilii, Dumeril's monitor, brown roughneck monitor
V. flavescens, golden monitor, yellow monitor, short-toed monitor
V. nebulosus, clouded monitor
V. rudicollis, black roughneck monitor

Subgenus Euprepiosaurus:

V. bennetti, Bennett's long-tailed monitor
V. caerulivirens, turquoise monitor
V. cerambonensis, Ceram monitor
V. colei Kei Islands monitor
V. doreanus, blue-tailed monitor
V. douarrha,  New Ireland monitor
V. finschi, Finsch's monitor
V. indicus, mangrove monitor
V. jobiensis, peach-throated monitor
V. juxtindicus, Rennell Island monitor
V. lirungensis, Talaud mangrove monitor
V. melinus, quince monitor
V. obor, sago monitor
V. rainerguentheri Rainer Günther's monitor
V. semotus, Mussau Island blue-tailed monitor
V. tsukamotoi, Mariana monitor
V. yuwonoi black-backed mangrove monitor, tricolor monitor
V. zugorum, silver monitor, Zug's monitor

 Subgenus Hapturosaurus:

V. beccarii, black tree monitor
V. boehmei, golden-spotted tree monitor
V. bogerti, Bogert's monitor
V. keithhornei, canopy goanna, blue-nosed tree monitor, Nesbit River monitor
V. kordensis, Biak tree monitor
V. macraei, blue-spotted tree monitor
V. prasinus, emerald tree monitor
V. reisingeri yellow tree monitor
V. telenesetes, mysterious tree monitor, Rossell tree monitor

Subgenus Odatria:

V. acanthurus, spiny-tailed monitor, ridge-tailed monitor, Ackie's dwarf monitor
V. a. acanthurus, spiny-tailed monitor
V. a. brachyurus, common spiny-tailed monitor
V. auffenbergi, Auffenberg's monitor, peacock monitor
V. brevicauda, short-tailed monitor
V. bushi, Pilbara stripe-tailed monitor, Bush's monitor
V. caudolineatus, stripe-tailed monitor
V. citrinus, Gulf ridge-tailed monitor
V. eremius, rusty desert monitor, pygmy desert monitor
V. gilleni, pygmy mulga monitor
V. glauerti, Kimberley rock monitor
V. glebopalma, twilight monitor, black-palmed rock monitor
V. hamersleyensis, Hamersley Range rock monitor
V. insulanicus, Groote Eylandt monitor
V. i. baritji, black-spotted ridge-tailed monitor
V. kingorum, Kings' rock monitor
V. mitchelli, Mitchell's water monitor
V. ocreatus, Storr's monitor
V. pilbarensis, Pilbara rock monitor
V. primordius northern blunt-spined monitor
V. scalaris, banded tree monitor
V. semiremex rusty monitor
V. similis, Similis monitor, spotted tree monitor
V. sparnus, Dampier Peninsula monitor
V. storri, eastern Storr's monitor
V. timorensis, Timor monitor
V. tristis
V. t. tristis, black-headed monitor
V. t. orientalis, freckled monitor

Subgenus Papusaurus

 V. salvadorii, crocodile monitor

Subgenus Philippinosaurus:
V. bitatawa, northern Sierra Madre forest monitor, butikaw, bitatawa
V. mabitang, Panay monitor, mabitang
V. olivaceus, Gray's monitor, butaan

 Subgenus Polydaedalus:
V. albigularis, rock monitor, white-throated monitor
V. a. albigularis, white-throated monitor
V. a. angolensis, Angolan monitor
V. a. microstictus, black-throated monitor
V. exanthematicus, savannah monitor, Bosc's monitor
V. niloticus, Nile monitor
V. stellatus, West African Nile monitor
V. ornatus, ornate monitor
V. yemenensis, Yemen monitor

Subgenus Psammosaurus:
V. griseus, desert monitor
V. g. griseus, desert monitor, grey monitor
V. g. caspius, Caspian monitor
V. g. koniecznyi, Indian desert monitor, Thar desert monitor
V. nesterovi, Nesterov's desert monitor

Subgenus Solomonsaurus:

 V. spinulosus, spiny-necked mangrove monitor, Solomon Islands spiny monitor

 Subgenus Soterosaurus:
V. bangonorum, Bangon monitor
V. cumingi, Cuming's water monitor, yellow-headed water monitor
V. dalubhasa, Enteng's monitor
V. marmoratus, marbled water monitor, Philippine water monitor
V. nuchalis large-scaled water monitor
V. palawanensis, Palawan water monitor
V. rasmusseni Rasmussen's water monitor
V. salvator, Asian water monitor
V. s. salvator, Sri Lankan water monitor
V. s. andamanensis, Andaman water monitor
V. s. bivittatus, two-striped water monitor, Javan water monitor
V. s. macromaculatus, Southeast Asian water monitor
V. s. ziegleri, Ziegler's water monitor
V. samarensis, Samar water monitor
V. togianus, Togian water monitor

Subgenus Varanus:
V. giganteus, perentie
V. gouldii, Gould's monitor, sand monitor, sand goanna
V. komodoensis, Komodo dragon
V. mertensi, Mertens' monitor
V. panoptes
V. p. panoptes, Argus monitor
V. p. horni, Horn's monitor
 V. p. rubidus, yellow-spotted monitor
V. priscus, megalania
V. rosenbergi, Rosenberg's monitor, heath monitor
V. spenceri, Spencer's monitor
V. varius, lace monitor

References

Further reading
Merrem B (1820). Versuchs eines Systems der Amphibien: Tentamen Systematis Amphibiorum. Marburg: J.C. Krieger. xv + 191 pp. + one plate. (Varanus, new genus, p. 58). (in German and Latin).

External links

Western Australian Museum photos
Scientific American article

 
Extant Miocene first appearances
Taxa named by Blasius Merrem